Luka Cvetićanin (born 11 February 2003) is a Serbian footballer who currently plays as a forward for Spanish club Cádiz B. He was included in The Guardian Next Generation 2020.

Club career
On 18 August 2021, Cvetićanin joined Segunda División RFEF side Cádiz B from Voždovac on a five-year contract, and was immediately loaned to Primera División RFEF side San Fernando CD.

Career statistics

Notes

References

2003 births
Living people
Sportspeople from Zrenjanin
Serbian footballers
Serbia youth international footballers
Association football forwards
Serbian SuperLiga players
FK Teleoptik players
FK Voždovac players
Cádiz CF players
San Fernando CD players
Serbian expatriate footballers
Serbian expatriate sportspeople in Spain
Expatriate footballers in Spain